The Free Press Summer Festival was an annual two-day music festival held in Houston, Texas at Buffalo Bayou's Eleanor Tinsley Park.

Other activities include fireworks, interactive art installations, a paint slide, music workshops, a 30-foot water wall and an off-site after party.

The festival was started to emphasize local musical performers, visual arts and artists. A recycling program, carbon offset credits and a partnership with the Texas Campaign for the Environment are implemented to help this festival become a greener experience.

The festival is organized by Free Press Houston, a local independent newspaper and Pegstar.net Presents, a local concert promotion company.

As of November 30, 2017 it has been made official by both Free Press Houston and Austin City Limits promoters that a new version of the festival is to take place in Houston on the weekend of March 24–25, 2018 under a new name; In Bloom Music Festival. This change comes in precisely on the ninth anniversary of the FPSF. In January 2019 it was announced that a new edition of the In Bloom Music Festival would not be held.

Environment

A recycling plan (with assistance from Little Joy Recycling) sorts aluminum, plastic, paper and glass. A free bottle of water is given to anyone who recycles 10 plastic bottles. All carbon output is balanced by carbon offset credits. Carpooling and bicycling to the festival are encouraged. Over 2000 attendees biked to the 2009 festival.

Fancy Pants Tent

In February 2011, a new pass was introduced that would have granted access to a premium side stage viewing area and entry to a limited access electronic music tent. The Fancy Pants Tent was intended to host exclusive performances by electronic musicians and provide complimentary bar drinks and hors d'œuvres, free massages and meet and greets.

Complaints about the cost led festival organizers to remove the Fancy Pants ticket tier in April 2011 and announced that all festival attendees would be able to watch the Fancy Pants acts.

History

2009
The 2009 festival was held August 8–9 with an attendance of approximately 30,000. A portion of the proceeds went to Project Row Houses (a community non-profit responsible for restoration, art and social activism in Houston's Third Ward since 1991).

The lineup for FPSF 2009 was:
Peekaboo Theory Band

2010
The 2010 festival was held June 5–6 with an attendance of over 45,000. A portion of the proceeds went to Buffalo Bayou Partnership (a non-profit corporation that develops and facilitates improvements to the Buffalo Bayou greenway system).

The lineup for FPSF 2010 was:

2011
The festival was held June 4–5, 2011 with a two-day attendance of over 60,000. A portion of the proceeds went to Houston Tomorrow (a nonprofit organization founded in 1998 to explore urban issues and to inform the discussion of growth in the Houston region).

The lineup for FPSF 2011 was:

2012
The festival was held June 2–3, 2012 with an estimated attendance of 92,000. Tickets for FPSF 2012 ranged in price from $75 to $115.

The lineup was:

2013
The festival was held on June 1–2, 2013 in Eleanor Tinsley Park. This marks the festival's first sold-out edition.

The lineup was:

2014
The 2014 festival was held on May 31 - June 1, 2014.

The venue was closed and the first day was evacuated at about 1:00pm due to bad weather and lightning. Many acts were bumped or rescheduled with no notice when gates were rumored to be reopened at 3:30pm. Upon return many acts had sound trouble. Weather and construction at the park caused many stages to be moved to the Allen Parkway tarmac, often creating congestion and competing for sound. Partial refunds were not offered.

The 2014 FPSF lineup consisted of:

2015
The 2015 festival was held on June 6–7, 2015.

The lineup was:

2016 
The event was held June 4–5, 2016 at NRG Park, Yellow Lot, Houston, TX

The lineup was:

2017 
The event was held June 3–4, 2017 at Eleanor Tinsley Park, Houston, TX.

Due to flash flood warnings, the remainder of the festival was cancelled.

The lineup was:
Post Malone
Lorde
Flume
G-Eazy
Cage the Elephant
Solange
Jon Bellion
Jauz
Grouplove
Miike Snow
Milky Chance
DVBBS
Portugal. The Man
St. Paul & the Broken Bones
Rufus du Sol
Big K.R.I.T
Charli XCX
The Strumbellas
Cashmere Cat
Jai Wolf
Bishop Briggs
The Struts
Frightened Rabbit
Amine
Cheat Codes
Party Favor
Anna Lunoe
Trill Sammy
Bad Suns
Vanic
Stick Figure
Hurray for the Riff Raff
Hippo Campus
Khruangbin
Grits & Biscuits
Cherry Glazerr
K.I.D
Echos
Dreamers
Coast Modern
Mod Sun
Rose Ette
Night Drive
-US
Bang Bangz
Camera Cult
The Wheel Workers
Deep Cuts
Kay Weathers
Miears
Black Swan Yoga
Dj Fredster
Hiram

Sponsors
As of 2013, the festival was supported by Absolut Vodka, Aio Wireless, American Apparel, Barefoot Refresh Wines, Budweiser, Cracker Jack'D, Chipotle Mexican Grill, Honest Tea, Houston Chronicle 29-95, ikan, IKEA, MKT Bar, Kroger, Lowe's, Red Bull, Seidio and the Texas Lottery.

As of 2017, the festival was supported by Budweiser, Brisk, Taco Bell, Dark Horse, DSW, Razor, TopGolf, Academy Sports + Outdoors, Jack Daniel's, Vita Coco and 11 Hundred.

References

External links

 Official Site
 News Clip
 HoustonPress Article

Festivals in Houston
June events
Rock festivals in the United States
Music of Houston
Music festivals established in 2009
Indie rock festivals
2009 establishments in Texas